Dayanand Balkrishna Bandodkar (12 March 1911 – 12 August 1973) and popularly known as Bhausaheb Bandodkar was the first Chief Minister of Goa, in the territory of Goa, Damaon& Diu. Born in Pernem to a Marathi family who had immigrated from Tuljapur, he became a wealthy mine owner following the Annexation of Goa. He sought to merge the territory with the state of Maharashtra. He swept the polls in 1963, 1967 and in 1972 while representing the Maharashtrawadi Gomantak Party (MGP) and remained in power until his death in 1973.

Bandodkar was a member of the Kalawantin community (now known as Gomantak Maratha Samaj in Goa). His proposal to merge Goa with Maharashtra was met with stiff opposition from the native Goans. Indira Gandhi, the then Prime Minister of India then offered him two options:
To retain Goa's current status as a Union Territory
To merge Goa into the neighboring state of Maharashtra and the other erstwhile Portuguese enclaves of Daman and Diu into the neighbouring state of Gujarat

A law to conduct a referendum to decide the issue of merger or otherwise of Goa, Daman and Diu with Maharashtra/Gujarat was passed by both the houses of the Indian Parliament, the Lok Sabha (on 1 December 1966), and the Rajya Sabha (on 7 December 1966 and the same received the assent of the President of India, Sarvepalli Radhakrishnan on 16 December 1966. An opinion poll was subsequently held on 16 January 1967 to decide the fate of the union territory which voted to retain its separate status by 34,021 votes.

Death
Bandodkar died in office on 12 August 1973 at age 62 and was succeeded by his daughter Shashikala Kakodkar. Three years after his death his son married the actress Leena Chandavarkar. He died at the age of 25 years on 7 November 1976.

Tenures
20 December 1963 – 2 December 1966 (3 years)
5 April 1967 – 23 March 1972 (5 years)
23 March 1972 – 12 August 1973 (1.5 years)

See also

Chief Minister of Goa
Goa Opinion Poll
Shashikala Kakodkar
Leena Chandavarkar
Bandodkar Gold Trophy

References

Chief Ministers of Goa
1911 births
1973 deaths
Maharashtrawadi Gomantak Party politicians
People from Mapusa
Businesspeople from Goa
Chief ministers from Maharashtrawadi Gomantak Party
Goa, Daman and Diu MLAs 1972–1977
Goa, Daman and Diu MLAs 1967–1972
Goa, Daman and Diu MLAs 1963–1967